Stockland Township is one of twenty-six townships in Iroquois County, Illinois, USA.  As of the 2010 census, its population was 243 and it contained 122 housing units.  Stockland Township formed as Crab Apple Township in September 1864, but changed its name to Stockland Township on an unknown date.

Geography

Unincorporated towns
 Cutmer at 
 Stockland at 
(This list is based on USGS data and may include former settlements.)

Cemeteries
The township contains Sugar Creek Chapel Cemetery.

Airports and landing strips
 Wichman Airport

Landmarks
 Dawson Park

Demographics

Political districts
 Illinois' 15th congressional district
 State House District 105
 State Senate District 53

References
 
 United States Census Bureau 2007 TIGER/Line Shapefiles
 United States National Atlas

External links
 City-Data.com
 Illinois State Archives

Townships in Iroquois County, Illinois
Townships in Illinois